Rimouski-Neigette is a regional county municipality in the Bas-Saint-Laurent region of Quebec, Canada.

The county seat is in Rimouski.

Subdivisions 
There are 10 subdivisions within the RCM:

Cities & Towns (1)
 Rimouski

Municipalities (1)
 Esprit-Saint

Parishes (7)
 La Trinité-des-Monts
 Saint-Anaclet-de-Lessard
 Saint-Eugène-de-Ladrière
 Saint-Fabien
 Saint-Marcellin
 Saint-Narcisse-de-Rimouski
 Saint-Valérien

Unorganized Territory (1)
 Lac-Huron

Demographics

Population

Language

Transportation

Access Routes 

Highways and numbered routes that run through the municipality, including external routes that start or finish at the county border:

Autoroutes

Principal Highways

Secondary Highways

External Routes
None

See also 
 List of regional county municipalities and equivalent territories in Quebec
 Rimouski Seignory

References

External links